George W. LeBreton (1810 – March 4, 1844) was a pioneer politician in the Oregon Country and served as the official recorder in the Provisional Government of Oregon.

Early life 
LeBreton was born in 1810 in Massachusetts. He then moved to Oregon along with Captain John H. Couch, an early sea merchant in Portland, Oregon. He arrived in Oregon aboard Couch's vessel Maryland in 1840. On February 18, 1841, he was elected as the recorder for the Champoeg Meetings and for the probate court that was created. In 1843, when the provisional government was formed, he was again elected as the recorder, the forerunner to the office of Secretary of State. He was killed by a Native American named Cockstock, who was known to attack his enemies' genitals, on March 4, 1844. Cockstock stabbed and shot LeBreton, who later died of his wounds. Cockstock was killed by Winslow Armstrong. The incident lead to the creation of the Oregon Rangers as a militia.

See also
List of assassinated American politicians

References

Secretaries of State of Oregon
Champoeg Meetings
1810 births
1844 deaths
People from Massachusetts
Members of the Provisional Government of Oregon
Oregon pioneers
People murdered in Oregon
Assassinated American politicians
Deaths by firearm in Oregon
Deaths by stabbing in Oregon
19th-century American politicians